Guillermo José Garlatti is the Catholic Archbishop of the Archdiocese of Bahía Blanca. He was born in Forgaria nel Fiurle, Udine, Northern Italy on July 12, 1940. His parents moved with him to La Plata, Argentina when he was a child, where he completed his primary and secondary education. He is fluent in Spanish, Italian and Latin.

He studied at the local seminary, and was ordained as a priest on July 5, 1964 at St. Cajetan Church. He obtained a degree in Theology at Universidad Católica Argentina and served as Prefect at St. Joseph Seminary.

He moved to Jerusalem where he completed biblical studies, which he then taught at the Pontifical Biblical Institute in Rome.

He was ordained a bishop in 1994 with title to the ancient see at Acque Regie and serving as auxiliary bishop of the Archdiocese of La Plata.  On February 20, 1997 he was named Bishop of the Diocese of San Rafael in Mendoza Province, Argentina.

On March 11, 2003, he was named Archbishop of the Archdiocese of Bahía Blanca (Archdioecesis Sinus Albi) succeeding Rómulo García, taking his seat on May 10, 2004. He is an active member of the Argentine National Episcopal Conference. His received his pallium from Pope John Paul II in Saint Peter's Square on June 28, 2004.

The ecclesiastical province of Bahía Blanca has the following suffragan dioceses: Diocese of Alto Valle del Río Negro, Diocese of Comodoro Rivadavia, Diocese of Río Gallegos, Diocese of San Carlos de Bariloche, Diocese of Santa Rosa and Diocese of Viedma.

See also
 Roman Catholicism in Argentina
 Archbishops
 Canon law

References
 Catholic-Hierarchy — Statistics on the Archdiocese of Bahía Blanca.
 Biografía de Monseñor Guillermo Garlatti

1940 births
Living people
21st-century Roman Catholic archbishops in Argentina
20th-century Roman Catholic bishops in Argentina
Argentine people of Italian descent
Academic staff of the Pontifical Biblical Institute
Roman Catholic archbishops of Bahía Blanca
Argentine Roman Catholic bishops
Roman Catholic bishops of La Plata in Argentina